Buchino is a sparsely inhabited village in Blagoevgrad Municipality, in Blagoevgrad Province, Bulgaria. It is situated on the foothills of Vlahina mountain 13 kilometers northwest of Blagoevgrad.

History

In 1891 Georgi Strezov wrote about the village:

"Buchino, 3 hours from Jumaya, towards the border, is surrounded by small forest, which is well preserved, because it was said anyone who dared to cut down a branch of this forest died. 75 houses, 360 Bulgarians and 75 Turks."

At the outbreak of the Balkan War in 1912, two people from Buchino were volunteers in the Macedonian-Edirne militia.

Population

By 1900, according to the famous statistics of Vasil Kanchov ("Macedonia. Ethnography and Statistics"), the population of Buchino (Bair Koi) numbered 517 people, of whom 442 were Bulgarian Christians and 75 Turks.

Population by census over the years:

References

Villages in Blagoevgrad Province